Caradrina petraea is a moth belonging to the family Noctuidae. The species was first described by Johan Martin Jakob von Tengström in 1869.

It is native to Eastern Europe.

References

Caradrinini